La Minerve may refer to:
La Minerve, a Quebec newspaper from the 19th century, initially founded to support the Parti patriote
La Minerve (France),  a French newspaper from the 19th century
La Minerve, Quebec, a municipality in the Quebec region of the Laurentians and named after the Quebec newspaper
French submarine Minerve (S647)